Candice Boucher is a South African model and actress. In 2010, Boucher was on the cover of Playboy and Sports Illustrated. In 2011, she starred in the Bollywood film Aazaan.

Early life and modeling

Candice Boucher was born in Durban, South Africa. When she was seventeen, she participated in her high school's annual pageant at the urging of her friends. She won the competition and a photo shoot with a local photographer. The photographer sent the photos of Boucher to Models International, a South African modeling agency. The company reached out to Boucher and offered her representation.

Career
After graduating high school, Boucher moved to Cape Town to pursue modeling. Boucher has been a cover model for Cosmopolitan and has modeled for FHM, GQ, Fila, Speedo, Sports Illustrated and Elle.

Boucher became the new model for Guess in 2009. In April 2010, Boucher was on the cover of, and had the pictorial in, Playboy. The photo shoot took place in Kenya and was titled "Undressed in Africa." Months later, in October, she was on the cover of Sports Illustrated. In 2011, she co-starred in the film Aazaan with Sachiin J Joshi.

Filmography

Personal life

Boucher lives in New York City.

References

External links

IGN Playboy Babe of the Day: Candice Boucher

Living people
Actors from Durban
South African female models
South African film actresses
South African expatriate actresses in India
Actresses in Hindi cinema
South African expatriates in the United States
Afrikaner people
2010s Playboy Playmates
21st-century South African women
21st-century South African actresses
Year of birth missing (living people)